The Council on Business & Society (CoBS) is a global alliance open to schools of business and management with a mission to educate tomorrow's responsible leaders and promote sustainable business practices among professionals. It convenes international forums focusing on topics at the crossroads of business and society and the common good that bring together leading academics, students, policy makers, NGOs, international organisations and business leaders. Previous forums have covered the topics of Leadership and Governance, Health and Healthcare, and New Energies. The CoBS also runs a yearly student CSR article writing competition, fosters inter-school faculty exchange and CSR-specific research projects. Other activities and initiatives can be found on the website.  

The Council disseminates the CSR and sustainability-centred research of the faculty from its member schools through the following:

- Bi-weekly vulgarised research articles via the Community Blog 
- A quarterly issue of Global Voice magazine
- 3-5 booklets on specialised CSR-related themes via its printing arm CoBS Publishing
- Condensed research capsules ("Research Pods") with practical insights for practitioners (launch planned in May 2020).

Member Schools 
The Council on Business & Society currently has seven member schools: ESSEC Business School - France (Cergy and Paris-La Défense campuses), Asia-Pacific (Singapore campus) and Africa (Rabat campus); FGV-EAESP in Brazil (São Paulo); School of Management Fudan University in Shanghai, China; IE Business School, Madrid, Spain; Keio Business School, Japan; Trinity College Dublin Business School, Ireland; and Warwick Business School, UK (Coventry and London).

References

External links 

ESSEC Business School
[[Category:FGV-EAESP]]
Fudan University
Keio University
Warwick Business School